Miss Philippines Earth 2020 was the 20th edition of the Miss Philippines Earth pageant. Due to the COVID-19 pandemic in the Philippines, the pageant was held via virtual contest via the contestants' residences on July 26, 2020.

At the end of the event, Janelle Tee crowned Roxanne Baeyens of Baguio as Miss Philippines Earth 2020. With her crowned are the court of elemental queens: Patrixia Santos was named Miss Philippines Air, Gianna Llanes was named Miss Philippines Water, Shane Tormes was named Miss Philippines Fire, and Ilyssa Mendoza was named Miss Philippines Eco Tourism 2020.

Originally to be broadcast by ABS-CBN, but due to the network's shutdown after the latter attempted to renew the franchise, the pageant was moved to GMA Network amidst of the ongoing COVID-19 pandemic.

Results
Color keys
  The contestant was a Winner in an International pageant.
  The contestant was a Runner-up in an International pageant.

Pre-pageant Events

Preliminary Rounds

Special Awards

Talent Competition

Sponsor Awards

Contestants
33 contestants representing various cities, municipalities, provinces, and communities abroad will compete for the title.

Judges 
The following served as a judge on the conclusion of virtual Miss Philippines Earth 2020, they were pre-recorded in a remote format:
 Alexandra Braun - Actress and Miss Earth 2005 from Venezuela
 Nicole Faria - Actress and Miss Earth 2010 from India
 Jose Mari Abacan - VP Program Management GMA Network, Inc.
 Carlos Bacani - Marketing Director of Peerless Products, Makers of Hana Shampoo
 Suzanne Gonzalez-Gommer - Actress and Miss Republic of the Philippines 1976 for Miss World 1975
 Matthias Gelber - Eco-Speaker and Environmental Management Advocate
 Lorraine Schuck - Founder and Executive VP of Miss Earth/Carousel Productions

References

External links
 Miss Philippines Earth website

2020
2020 in the Philippines
2020 beauty pageants